The Lincoln Cultural Center, also known as the former First Baptist Church of Lincolnton is a historic church location at 403 E. Main Street in Lincolnton, Lincoln County, North Carolina. The building was designed by architect James M. McMichael in a Classical Revival style with a tetrastyle two-story portico and a spherical dome.  Its plans were approved in 1919; construction was completed in 1922.  The building was acquired by Lincoln County and renovated as the Lincoln Cultural Center and opened for public use in September 1991.

It was added to the National Register of Historic Places in 1994.
The First Baptist Church of Lincolnton is currently located at 201 Robin Road, Lincolnton, North Carolina 28092.

References

Baptist churches in North Carolina
Churches on the National Register of Historic Places in North Carolina
Neoclassical architecture in North Carolina
Churches completed in 1920
Churches in Lincoln County, North Carolina
National Register of Historic Places in Lincoln County, North Carolina
Neoclassical church buildings in the United States